Red   is the second studio album by Norwegian dance-punk duo Datarock, released in the UK on 8 June 2009 and in the US on 1 September.

Track listing
 "The Blog" (3:11)
 "Give It Up" (2:47)
 "True Stories" (2:49)
 "Dance!" (3:38) 
 "Molly" (3:20)
 "Do It Your Way" (1:47)
 "In the Red" (3:34)
 "Fear of Death" (2:15)
 "Amarillion" (4:20)
 "The Pretender" (3:08)
 "Back in the Seventies" (3:00)
 "Not Me" (3:46)
 "New Days Dawn" (3:08)

Use in other media
"True Stories" was featured in FIFA 09 and "Give It Up" in FIFA 10.

References

External links
Review of Album

2009 albums
Datarock albums